Elitism is the belief or notion that individuals who form an elite—a select group of people perceived as having an intrinsic quality, high intellect, wealth, power, notability, special skills, or experience—are more likely to be constructive to society as a whole, and therefore deserve influence or authority greater than that of others. The term elitism may be used to describe a situation in which power is concentrated in the hands of a limited number of people. Beliefs that are in opposition to elitism include egalitarianism, anti-intellectualism, populism, and the political theory of pluralism.

Elite theory is the sociological or political science analysis of elite influence in society: elite theorists regard pluralism as a utopian ideal.

Elitism is closely related to social class and what sociologists term "social stratification". In modern Western societies, social stratification is typically defined in terms of three distinct social classes: the upper class, the middle class, and the lower class. 

Some synonyms for "elite" might be "upper-class" or "aristocratic", indicating that the individual in question has a relatively large degree of control over a society's means of production. This includes those who gain this position due to socioeconomic means and not personal achievement. However, these terms are misleading when discussing elitism as a political theory, because they are often associated with negative "class" connotations and fail to appreciate a more unbiased exploration of the philosophy.

Characteristics
Attributes that identify an elite vary; personal achievement may not be essential. Elite status can be based on personal achievement, such as degrees from top-rate universities or impressive internships and job offers, as well as on lineage or passed-on fame from parents or grandparents.

As a term, "elite" usually describes a person or group of people who are members of the uppermost class of society, and wealth can contribute to that class determination. Personal attributes commonly purported by elitist theorists to be characteristic of the elite include: rigorous study of, or great accomplishment within, a particular field; a long track record of competence in a demanding field; an extensive history of dedication and effort in service to a specific discipline (e.g., medicine or law) or a high degree of accomplishment, training or wisdom within a given field; a high degree of physical discipline.

Elitists tend to favor social systems such as meritocracy, technocracy and plutocracy as opposed to political egalitarianism and populism. Elitists believe only a few "movers and shakers" truly change society, rather than the majority of people who only vote and elect the elites into power.

Elitism can not be entirely defined in one nature. Its interpretations broaden over time and communities or groups can create their own interpretations of elitism. The common characteristic among all these forms of elitism is that it shows some form of heavy inferiority-superiority.

See also

 Classism
 Collective narcissism
 Exclusivism
 Global elite
 International Debutante Ball
 Ivory tower
 Narcissism
 Oligarchy
 Rankism
 Right-wing populism
 Sectarianism
 Self-righteousness
 Snobbery
 Social Darwinism
 Social Evolution
 Supremacism

References

External links

 Deresiewicz, William (June 2008). The Disadvantages of an Elite Education. "Our best universities have forgotten that the reason they exist is to make minds, not careers." The American Scholar.   Review of William Deresiewicz's book Excellent Sheep (April 2015), Foreign Affairs

Social groups
Political science
Ideologies
Oligarchy
Social theories
Narcissism
Prejudices
Elite theory
Psychological attitude
Political slurs